Shur Shureh (also Romanized as Shūr Shūreh) is a village in Darb-e Gonbad Rural District, Darb-e Gonbad District, Kuhdasht County, Lorestan Province, Iran. As of the 2006 census, its population is 710, with 141 families.

References 

Towns and villages in Kuhdasht County